Baron Péter Schell de Bauschlott (5 September 1898 – 2 March 1974) was a Hungarian politician, who served as Interior Minister in 1944. After the Arrow Cross Party's coup he was transported to Buchenwald by the Gestapo. In late April 1945 he was transferred to Tyrol together with about 140 other prominent inmates, where the SS left the prisoners behind. He was liberated by the Fifth U.S. Army on 5 May 1945.

After his liberation he emigrated to the United States.

References
    
 Magyar Életrajzi Lexikon

1898 births
1974 deaths
People from Košice-okolie District
People from the Kingdom of Hungary
Hungarian Interior Ministers
Hungarian people of German descent